The 1968 Atlanta Falcons season was the franchise's third year in the National Football League (NFL). After going an NFL-worst 1-12-1 last year, the Falcons slightly improved on that record by going 2-12, but they still finished tied for the worst record in the whole NFL and failed to qualify for the playoffs for the third consecutive season.

Offseason

NFL Draft

Personnel

Staff

Roster

Regular season

Schedule

Standings

References

External links 
 1968 Atlanta Falcons at Pro-Football-Reference.com

Atlanta Falcons
Atlanta Falcons seasons
Atlanta